Boyhood is a 2014 American epic coming-of-age drama film written and directed by Richard Linklater, and starring Patricia Arquette, Ellar Coltrane, Lorelei Linklater, and Ethan Hawke. Filmed from 2002 to 2013, Boyhood depicts the childhood and adolescence of Mason Evans Jr. (Coltrane) from ages six to eighteen as he grows up in Texas with divorced parents (Arquette and Hawke). Richard Linklater's daughter Lorelei plays Mason's sister, Samantha.

Production began in 2002 and finished in 2013, with Linklater's goal to make a film about growing up. The project began without a completed script, with only basic plot points and the ending written initially. Linklater developed the script throughout production, writing the next year's portion of the film after rewatching the previous year's footage. He incorporated changes he saw in each actor into the script, while also allowing all major actors to participate in the writing process by incorporating their life experiences into their characters' stories.

Boyhood premiered at the 2014 Sundance Film Festival and was released theatrically on July 11, 2014. The film competed in the main competition section of the 64th Berlin International Film Festival, where Linklater won the Silver Bear for Best Director. It received universal acclaim from critics, with praise for its performances, Linklater's screenplay and direction, and subject matter. It was also nominated for five Golden Globe Awards, winning Best Motion Picture – Drama, Best Director, and Best Supporting Actress for Arquette; five BAFTA awards, winning for Best Director and Best Film; and six Academy Awards, winning Best Supporting Actress for Arquette. On Metacritic, it is the best-reviewed film released in 2014, the 2010s, and the 21st century thus far, and is currently the most recent film to receive a rare score of 100 out of 100 on the same website.

Plot

In 2002, 6-year-old Mason Evans lives with his divorced mother, Olivia, and 8-year-old sister, Samantha, in a small town in Texas. Mason overhears Olivia arguing with her boyfriend, saying she has no free time due to parenting. In 2003, Olivia and the children move to Houston so she can attend the University of Houston and get a better job. In 2004, Mason's father, Mason Sr., visits Houston and takes Mason and Samantha bowling. When he drops the children off at home, he argues with Olivia while Mason and Samantha watch from a window. Olivia takes Mason to one of her classes, introducing him to her professor, Bill Welbrock; Mason sees them flirt.

In 2005, Olivia and Bill have married and blended their two families. They share experiences such as playing video games and attending a midnight release of Harry Potter and the Half-Blood Prince. Mason and Samantha are enrolled in the same school as their step-siblings, Mindy and Randy. There, Mason befriends Nicole, who has a crush on him. In 2006, Mason and Samantha bond with Mason Sr. as he takes them out for a day in Houston, culminating in a Houston Astros game and a sleepover at his house. Olivia continues her education and is initially supportive of Bill's strict parenting style, which includes many chores for the children and an enforced shaving of Mason's long hair. In 2007, Bill gradually becomes abusive and violent towards Olivia and the children due to his recent alcoholism. After he assaults Olivia, she moves out with Mason and Samantha to a friend's house and files for divorce while her step children stay with their father, facing an uncertain future. 

In 2008, Mason Sr. learns that Samantha has a boyfriend and talks to her and Mason about contraception. Mason Sr. takes his son go camping and they connect through music, film, and Mason's blossoming interest in girls. Mason and Samantha have grown into their lives in San Marcos, a town close to Austin. In 2009, Mason is bullied at school and playfully teased on a camping trip but starts receiving attention from girls. Olivia takes a job in teaching psychology at college and moves in with Jim, a student and Iraq War veteran.

In 2010, Mason has started high school and experimented with marijuana and alcohol. Mason Sr., who has remarried and has a baby, takes Mason and Samantha to visit his wife's parents. For Mason’s 15th birthday, Mason Sr. gives him a suit and CDs; Mason's step-grandparents give him a Bible and a shotgun. In 2011, Mason is lectured by his photography teacher, who sees his potential but is disappointed in his lack of ambition. Mason attends a party and meets Sheena, who becomes his girlfriend. After Mason arrives home late one night from a party, a drunk Jim confronts him about his late hours. Olivia and Jim subsequently break up, and the family's financial situation worsens.

In 2012, Mason and Sheena visit Samantha, who is attending the University of Texas at Austin, where they share their hopes and fears about college. Samantha's roommate discovers them asleep together in her dormitory. In 2013, during the end of Mason's senior year in high school, he has a painful breakup with Sheena, wins the second place silver medal in a state photography contest, and is awarded college scholarship money. Mason's family throws him a graduation party and toasts his success. Mason Sr. gives him advice about his breakup. Planning to sell the house and downsize, Olivia meets Samantha and Mason for lunch and asks them to sort through their possessions. Later that year, as Mason prepares to leave for college, Olivia breaks down, disillusioned by how quickly life has passed. At Sul Ross State University in Alpine, Mason moves into his dorm and meets his new roommate Dalton, Dalton's girlfriend Barb, and Barb's roommate, Nicole. Mason takes drugs given to him by Barb and the group goes hiking at Big Bend Ranch State Park. Nicole shares with Mason her belief that, rather than people seizing moments, moments seize people; Mason agrees.

Cast

Production

Development 
In May 2002, Linklater said that he would begin shooting an untitled film in his home city of Houston that summer. He planned to assemble the cast and crew for a few weeks' filming annually for 12 years. He said: "I've long wanted to tell the story of a parent–child relationship that follows a boy from the first through the 12th grade and ends with him going off to college. But the dilemma is that kids change so much that it is impossible to cover that much ground. And I am totally ready to adapt the story to whatever he is going through." IFC, the film's distributor, committed to a film budget of US$200,000 per year, or $2.4 million over the 12-year shooting period.

Casting 
Linklater hired the six-year-old Coltrane to play the boy. The cast could not sign contracts for the film due to the De Havilland Law, which makes it illegal to contract someone for more than seven years of work. Linklater told Hawke that he would have to finish the film if Linklater died.

Filming and writing 

Boyhood began filming without a completed script. Linklater had prepared each character's basic plot points, and the ending—including the final shot—but otherwise wrote the script for the next year's filming after rewatching the previous year's footage, incorporating the changes he saw in each actor. All major actors participated in the writing process, contributing their life experiences; for example, Hawke's character is based on his and Linklater's fathers—both Texan insurance agents who divorced and remarried—and Arquette's character is based on her mother, who resumed her education later in life and became a psychotherapist.

Despite the unconventional screenwriting process, Linklater stated that he had a general storyline in mind, and that the actors did not change the general direction of the story:

People think I asked Ellar, "What did you do in school the other day? Let's make a scene about that!" That never happened. The time we spent together was me just gauging where he was at in his life—what his concerns were and what he was doing. Then I would think, maybe we could move the camping trip up, and we can do this or that.

Scripts for certain scenes were sometimes finished the night prior to shooting. According to Hawke, the discussion about the possibility of additional Star Wars films is "the only honest-to-god improvised moment in the movie". The cast and crew gathered once or twice each year, on varying dates, to film for three or four days. The production team spent approximately two months in pre-production, and one month in post-production each year. When Arquette became the lead on the TV series Medium, she filmed her scenes over weekends.

Hawke said in 2013:

Although Linklater had referred to the project as Boyhood during the early years of production, in 2013 he settled on the title 12 Years, but was forced to rename it due to the release of 12 Years a Slave the year prior. In consideration of the possibility that the actors' circumstances or availability might change over the extended period of production, Linklater also had observed that the film potentially could also have been named Motherhood, Fatherhood, etc. Hawke was amazed that the producers "still had their job" at the film's completion, despite "(having) to hide a couple hundred thousand dollars a year for over a decade while we slowly made this movie". Despite the risks, Linklater was allowed an unusual level of freedom with the production, never having to show IFC the work as it progressed.

Costume designer Kari Perkins had to review each year's footage to ensure there were no accidental repetitions and to create a "flow" to the costumes.

When discussing shooting format in an interview, Linklater discussed how insistent he was on shooting 35mm film:

We very intentionally shot in the same way throughout, just to get a unified look. 35mm negative is about the most stable thing you could shoot on. We kinda had that from the beginning. I remember it not even being a question. You know the HD formats, I didn't really like them very much at all. I'm just not warming up to them. But they change a lot. The film would have six different looks if we tried to keep up.

Music

Reception

Box office
Boyhood premiered theatrically on July 11, 2014, in a limited release in four theaters in North America and grossed $387,618, with an average of $77,524 per theater, ranking number 19 at the box office. The film expanded the next week to 34 theaters and grossed $1.2 million, with an average of $34,418 per theater. The film's wide release occurred on August 15, opening in 771 theaters and grossing $2 million, with an average of $2,584 per theater and ranking number 11. The film's widest release in the U.S. was 775 theaters. The film ultimately earned $25.4 million domestically and $32 million internationally for a total of $57.3 million, against a $4 million production budget.

Critical reception
Its critical consensus reads, "Epic in technical scale but breathlessly intimate in narrative scope, Boyhood is a sprawling investigation of the human condition." Metacritic (which uses a weighted average) assigned Boyhood a score of 100 out of 100 based on 50 critics, indicating "universal acclaim". It is the highest rated of all films reviewed upon their original release on the site, and one of only nine films in the site's history to achieve a perfect aggregate score. It also holds the highest number of reviews for a film with a score of 100.

A collection of 25 French critiques on AlloCiné, including those from Le Monde and Cahiers du cinéma, indicates wide approval, with an average score of 4.0 out of 5.

In her review for The New York Times, Manohla Dargis stated that the film's realism was "jolting" and "so brilliantly realized and understated that it would be easy to overlook". A. O. Scott, also writing for The New York Times, called Boyhood the best film of 2014, saying that he could not think of any film that had affected him the way Boyhood had in his 15 years as a professional film critic. Peter Travers of Rolling Stone also named Boyhood the best movie of the year, calling it the year's "biggest emotional powerhouse". Peter Bradshaw of The Guardian called it "one of the greatest films of the decade". Richard Roeper gave the film an A+, calling it one of the greatest films he had ever seen. Wai Chee Dimock, writing in the Los Angeles Review of Books, compared Linklater's film with Nobel laureate J. M. Coetzee's memoir, Boyhood: Scenes from Provincial Life.

Many critics singled out Patricia Arquette and Ethan Hawke's performances for praise. Mick LaSalle of the San Francisco Chronicle said that watching Arquette was "like watching a generation's hopes and struggles, presented by an actress with a fullness of emotion, and yet with utter matter-of-factness". Michael Phillips, writing for the Chicago Tribune, lauded Arquette's "lack of pretense or affectation as a performer". Dana Stevens of Slate called Hawke's performance "Superb".  Indiewire, while ranking Ethan Hawke's best performances, felt that "Ethan swerves away from that easy route and instead digs down deep to create this portrait of a man who’s flawed but committed to growing, or at the very least doing the best he can today and hoping he’ll be able to do so again tomorrow".

Boyhood also earned the admiration of other filmmakers and artists. Director Christopher Nolan named Boyhood as his favorite film of 2014, calling it "extraordinary". Writer-director Mike Leigh, while accepting a fellowship from the British Academy of Film and Television Arts in 2015, called it "the definitive independent film". Writer Joyce Carol Oates tweeted her support, saying: "It is rare that a film so mimics the rhythms and texture of actual life as Boyhood. Such seeming spontaneity is a very high art." Poet and critic Dan Chiasson wrote in a contribution to The New York Review of Books: "This is a great film, the greatest American movie I have ever seen in a theater. It is great for what we see, but it is even greater for its way of making real what we cannot see, or for suggesting that what we cannot yet see we might one day see." According to Canadian philosopher Howard Adelman, "[Boyhood] is Huckleberry Finn for the twenty-first century, for it is only Mason Jr. who retains his honesty, integrity and sense of decency throughout ... a masterful movie not to be missed." Alejandro González Iñárritu, winner of the Academy Award for Best Director in 2015 and Linklater's fellow nominee, said that when he watched Boyhood, he sent an email to Linklater and thanked him for giving "this incredible gift".

Other critics reacted less positively to the film. Los Angeles Times critic Kenneth Turan described it as "at best, OK" and one whose "animating idea is more interesting than its actual satisfactions". Sam Adams of IndieWire argued that the unanimous praise for Boyhood is bad for film criticism, as it tends to marginalize the analysis of critics who disagree with the majority; Adams further elaborated that masterpieces are not made "by unanimous praise, but by careful scrutiny". Richard Brody of The New Yorker listed the film at the top of a year-end list he called "The Negative Ten", a list of films with "significant merit", but that also "occluded the view toward the year's most accomplished and daringly original work".

Several reviewers questioned the film's underlying racial assumptions. Writing for The Atlantic, Imran Siddiquee noted: “While Linklater and the character of Mason can choose not to see it, dialogue about race is happening all around them and affecting their lives and experiences.” Siddiquee also took issue with the apparent absence of non-white characters, particularly Latinos: “In this tale of a white family living in a state that borders Mexico, isn’t it strange that the only time they’re shown truly interacting with a Spanish-speaking non-white individual is when they are saving them from a life of manual labor?” Teo Bugbee, of The Daily Beast asserted: “As a treatise on the essential vacuity of the white liberal male, Boyhood is a staggering achievement. As a portrait of childhood in America, it is incomplete enough to be irresponsible.” Jaime Woo, of The Daily Dot, took issue with critics who identified the film as a portrait of “normal” Americans, asking: “More than one reviewer noted how impressive it was to capture these “ordinary” Americans: In fact, Salon's Andrew O’Hehir used the word three times in his review. So what does it mean when “ordinary” in 2014 still passes as the white experience? When the questionable treatment of ethnic minorities as props for the white characters nary raises a flag?”

Year-end lists
The international film magazine Sight & Sound named it the best film of 2014 after polling an international group of 112 film critics. Both Metacritic and Rotten Tomatoes listed Boyhood as the best-reviewed film of 2014. Village Voice Film Poll voted Boyhood as the best film of the year.

Boyhood appeared on more critics' annual "best-of" lists in 2014 than any other film, including the most first-place votes. According to CriticsTop10.com, it was included on 536 lists and topped 189 of them—with the latter being a record by that site's count.

1st – Jeffrey M. Anderson – San Francisco Examiner
1st – Marjorie Baumgarten – The Austin Chronicle
1st – Peter Bradshaw – The Guardian
1st – Justin Chang – Variety
1st – Simon Crook – Empire
1st – A. A. Dowd – The A.V. Club
1st – David Edelstein – New York
1st – Bill Goodykoontz – The Arizona Republic
1st – Stephen Holden – The New York Times
1st – Ann Hornaday – The Washington Post
1st – Peter Howell – Toronto Star
1st – Eric Kohn – Indiewire
1st – Mick LaSalle – San Francisco Chronicle
1st – Bob Mondello – National Public Radio
1st – Joe Morgenstern – The Wall Street Journal
1st – Andrew O'Hehir – Salon
1st – Michael Phillips – Chicago Tribune
1st – Claudia Puig – USA Today
1st – Richard Roeper – Chicago Sun-Times
1st – Joshua Rothkopf – Time Out New York
1st – A. O. Scott – The New York Times
1st – Betsy Sharkey – Los Angeles Times
1st – Sight & Sound contributors – British Film Institute
1st – Peter Travers – Rolling Stone
2nd – Tom Brook – British Broadcasting Corporation
2nd – Robbie Collin – The Daily Telegraph
2nd – Seth Malvin – A.V. Wire
2nd – Richard Corliss – Time
2nd – Chris Nashawaty – Entertainment Weekly
2nd – Kyle Smith – New York Post
2nd – Mark Kermode – BBC Radio Five Live
3rd – Rex Reed – The New York Observer
3rd – Craig Mathieson – The Sydney Morning Herald
4th – James Berardinelli – Reelviews
5th – Richard Lawson – Vanity Fair
5th – Todd McCarthy – The Hollywood Reporter
6th – Christopher Orr – The Atlantic
7th – Peter Rainer – The Christian Science Monitor
9th – Lou Lumenick – New York Post
10th – Matt Zoller Seitz – RogerEbert.com
Not ranked – Manohla Dargis – The New York Times
Not ranked – David Denby – The New Yorker
Not ranked – Steven Rea – The Philadelphia Inquirer
Not ranked – Dana Stevens – Slate

In a 2016 poll by BBC Culture, critics ranked Boyhood as the fifth greatest film since 2000. The film was also named the eighth "Best Film of the 21st Century So Far" in 2017 by The New York Times. In 2019, The Guardian ranked the film 3rd in its 100 best films of the 21st century list. In 2021, the film was ranked at No. 91 on Time Out magazine's list of The 100 best movies of all time.

Home media
Linklater told Hypable in July 2014 that he was planning a DVD/Blu-ray release through The Criterion Collection:

On August 21, Variety reported that Paramount Home Media Distribution had acquired the U.S. home entertainment rights for DVD, Blu-ray and digital distribution. IFC Films will retain VOD and EST sales as part of the deal. The film became available on Digital HD on December 9, 2014, and was released on Blu-ray and DVD on January 6, 2015. The Criterion Collection released a special edition of the film on Blu-ray and DVD on October 18, 2016.

Accolades

Boyhood earned dozens of accolades, including top prizes from the New York Film Critics Circle, the Los Angeles Film Critics Association, the Chicago Film Critics Association, the Broadcast Film Critics Association, and the London Film Critics' Circle. It received both the Golden Globe Award and the British Academy Film Award for Best Film. At the 87th Academy Awards, it received its sole Oscar for Supporting Actress, losing the other nominations to Birdman and Whiplash.

See also
 "Barthood", an episode of The Simpsons with a similar narrative
 Up documentary film series, following the lives of 14 people over 56 years
 Merrily We Roll Along, upcoming film directed by Linklater over the course of decades
 List of films with longest production time

References

External links

 
 
 
The Beatles Black Album from Boyhood at Spotify

2014 films
2014 independent films
2010s coming-of-age drama films
2010s English-language films
2010s teen drama films
American coming-of-age drama films
American independent films
American teen drama films
BAFTA winners (films)
Best Drama Picture Golden Globe winners
Best Film BAFTA Award winners
Films directed by Richard Linklater
Films featuring a Best Supporting Actress Academy Award-winning performance
Films featuring a Best Supporting Actress Golden Globe-winning performance
Films set in 2002
Films set in 2003
Films set in 2004
Films set in 2005
Films set in 2006
Films set in 2007
Films set in 2008
Films set in 2009
Films set in 2010
Films set in 2011
Films set in 2012
Films set in 2013
Films set in Austin, Texas
Films set in Houston
Films shot in Houston
Films whose director won the Best Direction BAFTA Award
Films whose director won the Best Director Golden Globe
2014 drama films
IFC Films films
Universal Pictures films
Films about children
Films about father–son relationships
Films about dysfunctional families
Films about divorce
Films about puberty
Films about alcoholism
Films about mother–son relationships
Films about parenting
2010s American films